Rajli  is a village in Hisar district in Haryana state of India. This village has total 1538 families residing. Rajli has population of 8089 as per government records.

Administration
Rajli village is administrated by Sarpanch through its Gram Panchayat, who is elected representative of village as per constitution of India and Panchyati Raj Act.

References 

Villages in Hisar district
Hisar (city)